Berkelium(IV) oxide, also known as berkelium dioxide, is a chemical compound with the formula BkO2. This compound slowly decays to californium(IV) oxide. It can be converted to berkelium(III) oxide by hydrogen reduction at 600 °C.
2BkO2 + H2 → Bk2O3 + H2O

Production
Berkelium(IV) oxide is produced by burning berkelium metal in air at 1200 °C. It can also be produced by reacting berkelium(III) oxide with oxygen at 600 °C.

References

Berkelium compounds
Oxides
Fluorite crystal structure